Lestidium rofeni is a species of fish. It is found in Taiwan and the Philippines.

Etymology
The fish is named in honor of Robert R. Rofen, a former research director of the George Vanderbilt Foundation at Stanford University.

References 

Paralepididae
Taxa named by Hans Hsuan-Ching Ho
Taxa named by Ken Graham
Taxa named by Barry C. Russell
Fish described in 2020
Fish of Taiwan
Fish of the Philippines